Hohmann may refer to:

 Hohmann (surname) (article includes list of persons named Hohmann)
 Hohmann transfer orbit, in orbital mechanics
 Hohmann (crater), a lunar crater
 9661 Hohmann (1996 FU13), an asteroid

See also
Hohman
 Homann
 Homan (disambiguation)